Trysfjorden is a fjord located in the municipality of Kristiansand in Agder county, Norway. The European route E39 highway runs along the inner part of the fjord, just west of the village of Lohne.  

In the mud at the bottom, scientists have discovered crustaceans that they believe are indigenous to the bay. Trysfjord has several islands and islets. The islets of Storholmen, Notholmen, and Urholmen lie just outside of Røsstad. Near the villages of Trysnes and Lastad lies the island of Lastadholmen  which in recent years has had the largest colony of terns in Southern Norway. The mouth of the fjord lies just south of Lastadholmen where the fjord empties into the Skaggerak.

See also
 List of Norwegian fjords

References

Fjords of Agder
Geography of Kristiansand